Tashawn Alexander Bower (born February 18, 1995) is an American football defensive end for the Las Vegas Raiders of the National Football League (NFL). He played college football at LSU.

Early years
Bower grew up in Kenilworth, New Jersey and attended Immaculata High School in Somerville, New Jersey.

Professional career

Minnesota Vikings
Bower signed with the Minnesota Vikings as an undrafted free agent on May 1, 2017. Despite being undrafted, he made the Vikings 53 man roster. On October 29, he made his NFL debut against the Cleveland Browns, seeing action on special teams. On November 19, in his second game played, he saw his first defensive action of his career against the Los Angeles Rams and recorded his first career sack, on the Rams' quarterback, Jared Goff.

During the 2019 offseason, Bower suffered a torn Achilles and was placed on the non-football injury list. He was waived from the non-football injury list on October 15, 2019.

New England Patriots
On November 21, 2019, Bower was signed to the New England Patriots practice squad. He signed a reserve/future contract with the Patriots on January 7, 2020.

On September 5, 2020, Bower was waived by the Patriots and signed to the practice squad the next day. He was elevated to the active roster on October 24 and 31 for the team's weeks 7 and 8 games against the San Francisco 49ers and Buffalo Bills, and reverted to the practice squad after each game. He was promoted to the active roster on November 9. On December 31, 2020, Bower was placed on injured reserve.

On August 31, 2021, Bower was waived by the Patriots and re-signed to the practice squad.

Minnesota Vikings
On November 25, 2021, Bower was signed by the Minnesota Vikings off the Patriots practice squad.

Las Vegas Raiders
On April 11, 2022, the Las Vegas Raiders signed Bower.

References

External links
New England Patriots bio
Minnesota Vikings bio
LSU Tigers bio

1995 births
Living people
American football defensive ends
Immaculata High School (New Jersey) alumni
Las Vegas Raiders players
LSU Tigers football players
Minnesota Vikings players
New England Patriots players
Players of American football from New Jersey
People from Kenilworth, New Jersey
People from Livingston, New Jersey
Sportspeople from Essex County, New Jersey
Sportspeople from Union County, New Jersey